Jayden Ngamanu (born 28 August 1997) is an Australian rugby union player who plays for the  in the Super Rugby competition. His position of choice is wing. Ngamanu has also represented Australia at Schoolboy level.

References 

Australian rugby union players
1997 births
Living people
Rugby union wings
Rugby union fullbacks
Brisbane City (rugby union) players
Queensland Reds players
Shizuoka Blue Revs players
Rugby union players from Perth, Western Australia